Li Kai (Born July 25, 1989) is a left-footed Chinese football player who currently plays for China League Two side Qingdao Youth Island.

Club career
Li Kai began his professional football career after graduating from the Dalian Shide youth team in 2008 and would make his senior debut for the club on June 25, 2008 in a league game over Liaoning Whowin where Dalian won 2-1. In his debut season Li Kai would go on to score his first goal for the club on September 12, 2008 in a 3-1 defeat to Shanghai Shenhua. However, the team suffered a disappointing season which saw Dalian flirt with relegation.

By the beginning of the 2010 league season Dalian allowed Li Kai to go on loan to top tier side Shaanxi Baorong Chanba and he would make his debut for the club on March 28, 2010 in a 1-1 draw against his parent club Dalian Shide. By July 28, 2010 he would then score his first goal for the club in a league game against Chongqing Lifan, which ended in a 2-2 draw. His loan period made his move permanent the following season before his new club decided to move to Guizhou and renamed themselves Guizhou Renhe in 2012.

On 2 January 2016, Kai transferred to Chinese Super League side Shijiazhuang Ever Bright. He made his debut for Shijiazhuang on 1 May 2016 in a 2–0 defeat against Tianjin Teda, coming on for Mi Haolun in the 81st minute.

In March 2017, Kai transferred to League Two side Jiangxi Liansheng. On 7 March 2018, Kai transferred to Qingdao Jonoon.

Career statistics
Statistics accurate as of match played 31 December 2020.

Honours

Club
Qingdao Hainiu
 China League Two: 2013

References

External links
Player stats at Sohu.com

1989 births
Living people
Chinese footballers
Footballers from Qingdao
Dalian Shide F.C. players
Beijing Renhe F.C. players
Qingdao F.C. players
Cangzhou Mighty Lions F.C. players
Jiangxi Beidamen F.C. players
Qingdao Hainiu F.C. (1990) players
Chinese Super League players
China League One players
Footballers at the 2010 Asian Games

Association football utility players
Asian Games competitors for China